Rubicon Township is one of thirteen townships in Greene County, Illinois, USA.  As of the 2010 census, its population was 345 and it contained 151 housing units.

Geography

Cities, towns, villages
 Greenfield (north edge)

Cemeteries
The township contains these eight cemeteries: Crawford, Drake-Million, Hermitage, Oakwood, Rose Hill West, Rubican, Short and Vandaveer.

Major highways
  U.S. Route 67

Airports and landing strips
 Tiger Landing Strip

Landmarks
 Lions Park

Demographics

School districts
 Greenfield Community Unit School District 10

Political districts
 Illinois's 17th congressional district
 State House District 97
 State Senate District 49

References
 
 United States Census Bureau 2007 TIGER/Line Shapefiles
 United States National Atlas

External links
 City-Data.com
 Illinois State Archives

Townships in Greene County, Illinois
Townships in Illinois